The 2003 Russian Super Cup was the 1st Russian Super Cup match, a football match which was contested between the 2002 Russian Premier League champion, Lokomotiv Moscow, and the winner of 2001–02 Russian Cup, CSKA Moscow. The match was held on 8 March 2003 at the Lokomotiv Stadium in Moscow, Russia. Lokomotiv Moscow beat CSKA Moscow 4–3 on penalties, after the extra time had finished in a 1–1 draw, to win the first Russian Super Cup.

Match details

See also
2003 in Russian football
2002 Russian Premier League
2001–02 Russian Cup

External links
 Official stats

Super Cup
Russian Super Cup
Russian Super Cup 2003
Russian Super Cup 2003
Russian Super Cup 2003
March 2003 sports events in Europe
2003 in Moscow
Sports competitions in Moscow